Mitogen-activated protein kinase kinase kinase 7-interacting protein 3 is an enzyme that in humans is encoded by the MAP3K7IP3 gene.

Function 

The product of this gene functions in the NF-kappaB signal transduction pathway. The encoded protein, and the similar and functionally redundant protein MAP3K7IP2/TAB2, forms a ternary complex with the protein kinase MAP3K7/TAK1 and either TRAF2 or TRAF6 in response to stimulation with the pro-inflammatory cytokines TNF or IL-1. Subsequent MAP3K7/TAK1 kinase activity triggers a signaling cascade leading to activation of the NF-kappaB transcription factor. The human genome contains a related pseudogene. Alternatively spliced transcript variants have been described, but their biological validity has not been determined.

Interactions 

MAP3K7IP3 has been shown to interact with MAP3K7IP2, TAB1 and MAP3K7.

References

Further reading